Francis Patrick Goss (July 21, 1879 – October 10, 1973) was an American politician in the state of Washington. He served in the Washington House of Representatives.

References

Republican Party members of the Washington House of Representatives
1879 births
1973 deaths